The Jan Meda International Cross Country is an annual cross country running competition held at the Jan Meda Race Course in Addis Ababa, Ethiopia. Typically held in January or February, the event serves as the national championship for Ethiopia and doubles as the national trials for the World Athletics Cross Country Championships.

Matching the world programme, the Jan Meda International holds four races, with senior and junior (under-20) races for both sexes. Similarly, the event featured a senior men's and women's short race over 4 km from 1998 to 2006, when that was a World Championship distance.

The same race course venue is used for the municipal Addis Ababa championships and the national cross country clubs championships. The 2004 and 2009 editions of the national championships doubled as the East African Cross Country Championships. The 2021, 2022 and 2023 editions were held in Sululta.

Past senior race winners

Short race

See also
African Cross Country Championships

References

Athletics competitions in Ethiopia
National cross country running competitions
Sport in Addis Ababa
February sporting events
Annual sporting events in Ethiopia
Cross country running in Ethiopia